The enzyme chorismate lyase catalyzes the chemical reaction
chorismate  4-hydroxybenzoate + pyruvate

This enzyme belongs to the family of lyases, specifically the oxo-acid-lyases, which cleave carbon-carbon bonds.  The systematic name of this enzyme class is chorismate pyruvate-lyase (4-hydroxybenzoate-forming). Other names in common use include CL, CPL, and UbiC.

This enzyme catalyses the first step in ubiquinone biosynthesis, the removal of pyruvate from chorismate, to yield 4-hydroxybenzoate in Escherichia coli and other Gram-negative bacteria.  Its activity does not require metal cofactors.

Activity

Catalytic activity 

 Chorismate = 4HB + pyruvate
 This enzyme has an optimum pH at 7.5

Enzymatic activity 

Inhibited by:
 Vanillate
 4-hydroxybenzaldehyde
 3-carboxylmethylaminmethyl-4-hydroxybenzoic acid
 4HB - ubiC is inhibited by the product of the reaction, which scientists believe serves as a control mechanism for the pathway

Pathway 
The pathway used is called the ubiquinone biosynthesis pathway, it catalyzes the first step in the biosynthesis of ubiquinone in E. coli.  Ubiquinone is a lipid-soluble electron-transporting coenzyme.  They are essential electron carriers in prokaryotes and are essential in aerobic organisms to achieve ATP.

Nomenclature 
There are several different names for chorismate lyase.  it is also called chorismate pyruvate lyase (4-hydroxybenzoate-forming) and it is also abbreviated several different ways: CPL, CL, and ubiC.  It is sometimes referred to as ubiC, because that is the gene name.  This enzyme belongs to the class Lyases; more specifically the ox-acid-lyase or the carbon-carbon-lyases.

Taxonomic lineage: bacteria → proteobacteria → gammaproteobacteria → enterobacteriales → enterobacteriaceae → escherichia → escherichia coli

Structure 
This enzyme is a monomer.  Its secondary structure contains helixes, turns, and beta-strands. It has a mass of 18,777 daltons and its sequence is 165 amino acids long.

Binding sites 
 position: 35(M)
 position: 77(R)
 position: 115(L)

Mutagenesis 
 position: 91- G → A; increases product inhibition by 40%.  No effect on substrate affinity.
 position: 156 - E → K; loss of activity

References

Further reading
 
 
 

Protein families
EC 4.1.3
Enzymes of unknown structure